This is a list of Iowa suffragists, suffrage groups and others associated with the cause of women's suffrage in Iowa.

Groups 

 Afro-American Protective Association.
 Boone Equality Club.
 Chariton Equal Suffrage Society.
 Des Moines League of Colored Women Voters, formed in 1912.
 Iowa Equal Suffrage Association (IESA), formed as the Iowa Woman Suffrage Association (IWSA) in 1870.
 Iowa Federation of Colored Women's Clubs.
 Iowa Federation of Women's Clubs (IFWC).
 Men's League for Women's Suffrage, organized in 1910.
 Men's League of Perry.
 Northern Iowa Woman Suffrage Association, formed in 1869.
 Political Equality Club of Sioux City, formed in 1889.
 Polk County Suffrage Association.
 Waterloo Suffragette Council.
 Woman's Christian Temperance Union (WCTU).

Suffragists 

 Mary Newbury Adams.
 Teresa Adams (Davenport).
 Adelaide Ballard.
 Mary A. Beavers (Mount Pleasant).
 Evelyn H. Belden.
 Narcissa T. Bemis.
 Amelia Bloomer (Council Bluffs).
 Sue M. Wilson Brown (Des Moines).
 Martha C. Callanan.
 Margaret W. Campbell.
 Carrie Chapman Catt (Charles City).
 Nettie Sanford Chapin (Marshalltown).
 Mary Jane Coggeshall.
 Mary Darwin (Burlington).
 Keziah Anderson Dorrance (Taylor County).
 Helen Downey.
 Joseph Dugdale (Mount Pleasant).
 Marion Howard Dunham (Burlington)
 Flora Dunlap (Des Moines).
 Matilda Fletcher (Council Bluffs).
 Mariana Thompson Folsom.
Alvah and Martha Frisbie
 Eleanor Gordon (Boone).
 Eliza H. Hunter.
 Caroline Ingham (Kossuth County).
 Harvey Ingham (Kossuth County).
 Grace Morris Allen Jones (Burlington).
 Jennie A. Kilburne (Adair County).
 Anna B. Lawther (Dubuque).
 James Rush Lincoln.
 Mabel Lodge (Cedar Falls).
 Arabella Mansfield.
 Jane Amy McKinney.
 Carrie Dean Pruyn.
 Lizzie Bunnell Read (Algona).
 Gertrude Rush.
 Mary Safford.
 Anna H. Satterly.
 Annie Nowlin Savery (Des Moines).
 Vivian Smith
 Rowena Edson Stevenson (Boone).
 Adeline Morrison Swain.
 Mary Beaumont Welch (Ames).
 Henrietta Wilson (Dubuque).
 Mattie Woods.

Politicians supporting women's suffrage 

 Cyrus C. Carpenter.
 William L. Harding.
 William Larrabee.
 Benjamin F. Murray (Winterset).
 Henry O'Connor.
 William G. Wilson (Davis County).

Publications 

 Woman's Standard, created in 1886.

Suffragists campaigning in Iowa 

 Jane Addams.
 Susan B. Anthony.
 Henry Browne Blackwell.
 Martha H. Brinkerhoff.
 Laura Clay.
 Phoebe Couzins.
 Hannah Tracy Cutler.
 Emma Smith DeVoe.
 Anna Dickinson.
 Frances Dana Gage.
 Helen M. Gougar.
 Laura A. Gregg.
 Ella Harrison.
 Mary Garrett Hay.
 Matilda Hindman.
 Laura M. Johns.
 Addie M. Johnson.
 Elizabeth A. Kingsbury.
 Catharine Waugh McCulloch.
 Henrietta G. Moore.
 Anna Howard Shaw.
 Elizabeth Cady Stanton.
 Sarah Burger Stearns.
 Lucy Stone.
 Harriet Taylor Upton.
 Frances Woods.

See also 
 Women's suffrage in Iowa
Timeline of women's suffrage in Iowa
Women's suffrage in states of the United States
 Women's suffrage in the United States

References

Sources 

 
 
 
 

 

Iowa suffragists
Activists from Iowa
History of Iowa
Suffragists
History of women in Iowa
Iowa suffrage